The Devil in the Convent (Italian: Il Diavolo in convento) is a 1950 Italian comedy film directed by Nunzio Malasomma and starring Gilberto Govi, Carlo Ninchi and Mariella Lotti.

It was shot at the Icet Studios in Milan and on location in Genoa and Gavi in Piedmont. The film took around 274 million lira at the Italian box office.

Cast 
Gilberto Govi as  frate Angelo
Mariella Lotti as Adriana
Carlo Ninchi as Milone
Ave Ninchi as Caterina
Giorgio Corradini as  Pierino
Georges Galley as  Agostino
Barbara Florian as  Maria
Leopoldo Valentini as  fra Raffaele
Mario Pisu as father Claudio
Nerio Bernardi as  commendator Brina 
Édouard Delmont

References

Bibliography
 Chiti, Roberto & Poppi, Roberto. Dizionario del cinema italiano: Dal 1945 al 1959. Gremese Editore, 1991.

External links 
 

1950 films
Italian black-and-white films
1950s Italian-language films
Films directed by Nunzio Malasomma
1950 comedy films
Italian comedy films
1950s Italian films